Live Totem Pole is a live EP released in 1992 by Firehose.  It consists of seven tracks, five of which are cover versions.  The cover of Blue Öyster Cult's "The Red and the Black" had been recorded by Minutemen (Watt and Hurley's seminal punk rock band) and released on 3-Way Tie (For Last).

Watt's introduction to "Revolution (Part Two)" contains a nod to Gibby Haynes, the lead singer of Butthole Surfers — "This is a song for today.  Hope I don't fuck it up, Gibby."

The EP has become a collector's item due to its discontinuation shortly after its release.

The cover art is by Raymond Pettibon.

Track listing
 "The Red And The Black" (Blue Öyster Cult) – 3:34
 "Sophisticated Bitch" (Public Enemy) – 3:52
 "Revolution (Part Two)" (Butthole Surfers) – 3:09
 "Slack Motherfucker" (Superchunk) – 2:40
 "What Gets Heard" (Mike Watt) – 2:20
 "Mannequin" (Wire) – 2:26
 "Makin' The Freeway" (Watt) – 2:15

Personnel
 Mike Watt – bass, vocals
 Ed Crawford – guitar, vocals
 George Hurley – drums

References 

1992 EPs
Firehose (band) albums
1992 live albums
Live EPs
Covers EPs